Maryland House of Delegates District 31A is one of the 67 districts that compose the Maryland House of Delegates. Along with subdistrict 31B, it makes up the 31st district of the Maryland Senate. District 31A includes part of Anne Arundel County, and is represented by one delegate.

Demographic characteristics
As of the 2020 United States census, the district had a population of 46,036, of whom 35,500 (77.1%) were of voting age. The racial makeup of the district was 23,967 (52.1%) White, 11,505 (25.0%) African American, 304 (0.7%) Native American, 2,033 (4.4%) Asian, 22 (0.0%) Pacific Islander, 3,888 (8.4%) from some other race, and 4,302 (9.3%) from two or more races. Hispanic or Latino of any race were 6,552 (14.2%) of the population.

The district had 27,682 registered voters as of October 17, 2020, of whom 5,977 (21.6%) were registered as unaffiliated, 7,445 (26.9%) were registered as Republicans, 13,792 (49.8%) were registered as Democrats, and 249 (0.9%) were registered to other parties.

Past Election Results

2014

2018

References

31A